Nigel Charles Windsor Fenton (born 17 November 1963) is an English former cricketer.

The son of Charles Fenton and his wife, Shirley Windsor, He was educated at Rugby School. He then studied at Durham University, where he was awarded a half-palatinate for cricket in 1987.

Fenton continued his education at Magdalene College, Cambridge. While studying at Cambridge, he made his debut in first-class cricket for Cambridge University against Derbyshire at Fenner's in 1988. He played first-class cricket for Cambridge until 1991, making ten appearances, though he did not feature for Cambridge in 1989 or 1990. Playing as a right-arm fast-medium bowler, he took 21 wickets at an average of 39.09, with best figures of 4 for 64. In addition to playing first-class cricket while at Cambridge, Fenton also appeared in four List A one-day matches for the Combined Universities cricket team in the 1988 Benson & Hedges Cup, taking 6 wickets at an average of 20.33.

References

External links

1965 births
Living people
Cricketers from Bradford
People educated at Rugby School
Alumni of Magdalene College, Cambridge
English cricketers
Cambridge University cricketers
British Universities cricketers
English cricketers of 1969 to 2000
English cricketers of the 21st century
Alumni of the College of St Hild and St Bede, Durham